The Judy Collins Concert is a 1964 live album by American singer and songwriter Judy Collins, which included combined traditional folk material with songs by Bob Dylan and Tom Paxton. It was recorded on March 21, 1964 at the Town Hall in New York City.

With the exception of "Hey, Nelly, Nelly", none of the songs had been previously recorded by Collins.

Track listing 
Side one
 "Winter Sky" (Billy Edd Wheeler) – 3:44
 "The Last Thing on My Mind" (Tom Paxton) – 3:25
 "Tear Down the Walls" (Fred Neil) – 2:18
 "Bonnie Boy Is Young" – 4:11
 "Me and My Uncle" (John Phillips) – 2:46
 "Wild Rippling Water" – 3:23
 "The Lonesome Death of Hattie Carroll" (Bob Dylan) – 5:28

Side two
 "My Ramblin' Boy" (Paxton) – 4:58
 "Red-Winged Blackbird" (Wheeler) – 2:15
 "Coal Tattoo" (Wheeler) – 2:48
 "Cruel Mother" – 5:43
 "Bottle of Wine" (Paxton) – 2:23
 "Medgar Evers Lullaby" (Richard Weisman) – 3:35
 "Hey, Nelly, Nelly" (Jim Friedman, Shel Silverstein) – 2:59

Personnel
Judy Collins – guitar, keyboards, vocals

Additional musicians
Chuck Israels – bass, cello
Steve Mandell – second guitar, banjo

Technical
Harold Leventhal – presenter
Jac Holzman – producer
Mark Abramson – producer, editing
David B. Jones – engineer
William S. Harvey – cover design
Jim Marshall – cover photo
Jack Goddard – liner notes

References
 

Judy Collins live albums
albums produced by Jac Holzman
Albums produced by Mark Abramson
1964 live albums
Elektra Records live albums
Albums recorded at the Town Hall